Satyabrata Rai Chowdhuri  (1935–2016) was an Indian political scientist, political historian and international relations expert.

He was a senior research fellow in international relations at the Institute of Commonwealth Studies, University of London, United Kingdom, and an Emeritus Professor of Political Science at India's University Grants Commission. Earlier he taught at the universities of Calcutta, Rabindra Bharati, London and Oxford.

Rai Chowdhuri was a prolific writer with primary interests in nuclear issues and South Asian Politics. He was a columnist at Project Syndicate, and Asia Times Online, besides many news dailies across the globe. He was also known for his books Nuclear Politics and Leftism in India among others.

His scholarship in South Asian Studies was honored in 2006 with the Fellowship of the Royal Asiatic Society, the UK's highest society in Asian studies.

References

International relations scholars
Indian political scientists
British political scientists
Academic staff of the University of Calcutta
Academics of the University of Oxford
Academics of the London School of Economics
Academics of the University of London
Academics of the Institute of Commonwealth Studies, London
Fellows of the Royal Asiatic Society
1935 births
Living people
Indian emigrants to England
University of Calcutta alumni